Gaika Tavares, better known simply as Gaika, is a British artist and writer from South London. His debut album, Basic Volume, was released in July 2018 by Warp Records, who describe the sound as "gothic dancehall and industrial electronics".

Early life
Gaika's parents came from Grenada and Jamaica, moving to the UK in the 1960s. He was previously a part of Manchester rap crew Murkage.

Music career
Following the mixtapes Machine and Security, Gaika released the EP Spaghetto in 2016. The Guardian described his music as blending "Caribbean dancehall tradition and London grime but also nod to R&B, trip-hop, grunge and Prince." Dazed have described him as "electronic music's answer to Basquiat", while US magazine Interview described the sound as "experimental R&B". Gaika has described his sound using the word "Ghettofuturism".

Gaika's debut album Basic Volume was released in July 2018. The Guardian praised the album as "a terrifically impressive and populist debut". The album also received positive reviews from the Financial Times, The Independent, Noisey and Music OMH.

In August 2018, Gaika exhibited System, a collaboration with Boiler Room and Somerset House Studios, "a sculpture which fills the middle portion of the Lancaster Room at Somerset House." He told the Evening Standard that "Carnival and sound system culture is about space, and holding space. It’s about literally drawing a line in the sand and saying: ‘This is who we are and we’re here to stay. You can’t turn us off’."

On May 2019, Gaika released a mixtape named Heaters 4 The 2 Seaters by Warp Records, and on July 2020 he released the Seguridad EP on Mexican record label N.A.A.F.I.

Personal life
Writing for Dazed magazine in June 2018, Gaika criticised the Metropolitan Police's decision to crack down on Drill music, saying: "Drill is the product of a looted world that wasn’t designed with us in mind, the result of much more than just a few angry kids on estates, it’s the result of centuries of reality." Gaika has also discussed the ways in which the Notting Hill Carnival is presented by the press, while its cultural significance is overlooked.

Gaika has also written fiction for Dazed.

Discography

Studio albums
 War Island Ost (2022)
 Basic Volume (2018)

EPs
 Spaghetto (2016)
 Spectacular Empire I (2016)
 Spectacular Empire II (2017)
 Seguridad (2020)

Mixtapes
 Machine (2015)
 Security (2016)
 Heaters 4 the 2 Seaters (2019)

Singles
 The Deal (2016)
 Smoke Break (2017)
 Crown & Key (2017)
 Immigrant Sons (2018)
 Seven Churches For St Jude (2019)

References

Black British male rappers
English male rappers
Jamaican musicians
Living people
English people of Jamaican descent
English people of Grenadian descent
People from Brixton
Rappers from London
Year of birth missing (living people)